RACE encoding is a method for encoding foreign languages that use non-English characters (Chinese, Japanese, etc.) in ASCII characters for storage in domain name system servers. All names without non-English characters are unchanged. RACE codes are made up of digits, letters and dashes.

RACE encoding is part of the larger scheme of the Universal Character Set specifically the ISO/IEC 10646. The assignment of characters also coincides with Unicode.

Today, it is mostly abandoned in favor of punycode.

Nomenclature  
RACE is an acronym for its main purpose. 
R stands for Row-based
A for ASCII
C for Compatible
E Encoding

References

External links
 Acmqueue.com, DNS Complexity, Paul Vixie, ACM Queue

Domain Name System